Toomas Urb (born on 2 December 1958 in Tartu) is an Estonian actor and singer.

In 1984 he graduated from Tallinn State Conservatory Stage Art Department. From 1984 until 1987, he was an actor an Estonian Drama Theatre. Since 1989 he has lived in the United States. Besides theatre roles he has played also in several films.

1978 until 1980, he was a member of Estonian sailing team.

He has recorded music with his brother Tarmo Urb.

He is a member of Screen Actor's Guild.

Personal life
Toomas Urb's older brother is actor and singer Tarmo Urb. His nephew is actor and model Johann Urb.

Filmography

 1986: Saja aasta pärast mais
 1984: Hundiseaduse aegu 
 1983: Suletud ring 
 2005: Stiilipidu

References

Living people
1958 births
Estonian male stage actors
Estonian male film actors
Estonian male television actors
20th-century Estonian male actors
21st-century Estonian male actors
20th-century Estonian male singers
Estonian Academy of Music and Theatre alumni
Estonian male sailors (sport)
Estonian expatriates in the United States
Male actors from Tallinn